USCGC Sequoia (WLB-215) is a United States Coast Guard 225-foot Seagoing Buoy Tender, homeported in Apra Harbor, Naval Base, a deep-water port on the western side of the United States territory of Guam.  

The primary mission of the Cutter is to maintain aids to navigation in Guam and the Northern Marianas. As with all Coast Guard Cutters, she functions as a multi-mission asset, responsible for marine environmental protection, search and rescue, law enforcement, and Homeland Security missions.  USCGC Sequoia regularly conducts fisheries enforcement missions through the Western Pacific, in support of Western and Central Pacific Fisheries Commission treaties and regulations, as well as supporting bilateral agreements between the Pacific Island nations of the Marshall Islands and the Federated States of Micronesia.

Sequoia is one of sixteen Juniper-class buoy tenders built and commissioned from 1996–2004.  She was launched on August 23, 2003 on the Menominee River by Marinette Marine Corporation (MMC) in Marinette, Wisconsin.  She replaced the USCGC Sassafras (WLB-401) as the only buoy tender in the Marianas. She is currently (2022-11-07) in Oranjestad, Aruba.

External links
 https://www.facebook.com/pages/USCGC-SEQUOIA-WLB-215/383079718641
 http://www.uscg.mil/d14/cgcsequoia/

References

Ships of the United States Coast Guard
Juniper-class seagoing buoy tenders
2003 ships
Ships built by Marinette Marine